Pettifer or Pettyfer is an English surname. The name Pettifer comes from the Old French nickname "pied de fer", meaning "Iron Foot".

Notable people with the surname include:

Alex Pettyfer (born 1990), English actor
Arran Pettifer (born 2003), English footballer
Brian Pettifer (born 1949), British actor
James Pettifer, British academic, writer and journalist
Julian Pettifer (born 1935), English television journalist
 Joel Pettyfer (born 1987), English wrestler, known as Joel Redman
Julian Barratt Pettifer (born 1968), known as Julian Barratt, English comedian
Kayne Pettifer (born 1982), Australian rules footballer
 Steve Pettifer (born 1965), English computer scientist
Tiggy Legge-Bourke (born 1965), English nanny, now Tiggy Pettifer

References